Hägar the Horrible is the title and main character of an American comic strip created by cartoonist Dik Browne and syndicated by King Features Syndicate. It first appeared in February 1973 and was an immediate success. Since Browne's retirement in 1988 (and subsequent death), his son Chris Browne (May 1952-February 5, 2023) continued the strip until his death, with artwork by Gary Hallgren. , Hägar is distributed to 1,900 newspapers in 56 countries and translated into 12 languages. The strip is a caricature commenting on modern-day life in the United States through a loose interpretation of Viking Age Scandinavian life.

Overview
"Hagar the Terrible" was the nickname given to the late Dik Browne by his sons; Browne adapted the name to Hägar the Horrible for the purposes of alliteration. After his death, Dik Browne's sons changed the title of the strip to Dik Browne's Hägar the Horrible in tribute. The name is pronounced Hay-gar according to Chris Browne.

Hägar (sometimes written "Hagar") is a shaggy, scruffy, overweight, red-bearded Viking. He regularly raids England and sometimes France. Animation-industry writer Terence J. Sacks notes the juxtaposition of contrary qualities that make Hägar endearing to the reader: "Hägar's horned helmet, rough beard and shaggy tunic make him look somewhat like a caveman or Opera-Viking, but you also know Hägar has a soft underbelly occasionally exposed."

Setting and format
The strip is set in the Middle Ages in an unnamed coastal village somewhere in Norway. Hägar's Norwegian lineage was revealed at least once in a daily strip (July 18, 1984). Hamlet asks Hägar if he can tell people they're Norwegian. Hägar replies that it isn't necessary: "It might sound like bragging."

Although anachronisms occur, they are not deliberate mainstays of the strip, as in other period burlesque strips like The Wizard of Id. The strip follows a standard gag-a-day daily format with an extended color sequence on Sundays.

Much of the humor centers around Hägar's interactions with his longship crew, especially "Lucky Eddie" (when on voyages or during periodic sacking and looting raids). Sometimes the humor would be at the tavern with the other Vikings, or Hagar dealing with his family, who are not like stereotypical Vikings. Supporting characters include his overbearing, nagging and occasionally jealous wife, Helga; their brilliant and sensitive son, Hamlet; their pretty but domestically hopeless daughter, Honi; Helga's pet duck, Kvack; Hägar's loyal and clever dog, Snert, and other secondary, recurring characters.

Illustration style
Hägar the Horrible uses a clear, sparse editorial-style line drawing, with minimal foreground or background detail, shading or embellishment. Observers argue this is likely derived from Dik Browne's experience as a courtroom illustrator and illustrator of maps of important World War II battles prior to 1942, plus his experience as an illustrator (Staff Sergeant) attached to a US Army Engineer unit where he drew technical diagrams, maps and other documents requiring very clear depictions. Prior to Hägar, Browne was best known for co-creating the comic strip Hi and Lois with his partner, Beetle Bailey creator Mort Walker. Browne was reportedly the real-life inspiration for the character Plato, the intellectual private in Beetle Bailey.

Cast of characters
Dik Browne based the characters own his family. His son Chris said, "And he was a big man like me. He was three hundred pounds and six feet two and had a flaming red beard."

 Hägar the Horrible: the slovenly, overfed Viking protagonist. Hägar is both a fierce warrior and a family man—with the same problems as your average modern suburbanite. One running gag involves his exceptionally poor personal hygiene; for example, his annual bath (July 14) is a time of national rejoicing and celebrations. Another source of comedy is Hägar's simplistic, childlike cluelessness, often finding himself at odds with his more sensible family members. Much to Hägar's chagrin, on the few occasions where he behaves maturely (such as helping Helga in daily tasks or displaying self-control of his titanic appetite), the other characters are often caught off guard, since they are more accustomed to his bumbling and childish attitude. The most notable example was when Helga demanded that Hägar speak the truth at least one time, Hägar agrees and does so, something that pleasantly surprises even God himself, who promptly makes angels play the trumpets in celebration of this "miracle". 
 Helga: Hägar's large-framed, bossy housewife, dressed in operatic, Brünnhilde-like blonde braids and helmet. She is the quintessential maternal "over-mothering" figure. Helga bickers with Hägar over his poor habits—such as forgetting to wash his hands after pillaging, or not wiping his feet before entering the hovel. She is often seen trying to teach her old-fashioned values to her daughter Honi, though Honi never truly "gets" it. Her formidable appearance is based on that of a Wagnerian Valkyrie.
 Lucky Eddie: Hägar's first mate, best friend and lieutenant in Viking raids. Contrary to popular depictions of Vikings as brawny macho warriors, Eddie is a short, skinny, chinless, awkward and naïve weakling. The ironically-named "Lucky" Eddie is, in fact, so unlucky he can be crushed by a stray rainbow. He wears a funnel rather than a helmet on his head, which he always keeps on because he's afraid of squirrels. Unlike Hägar, Eddie is educated enough to be able to read and speak in other languages—though paradoxically this does not give him much advantage over other Vikings or his enemies. In the Jan 9, 2000 Sunday strip, Eddie reveals that he lived in a cave on the coast of Ireland. He was captured by the Last Roman Legion, to make them maps, until he was rescued by Hagar. Having been unconditionally known and accepted simply by his moniker of "Lucky Eddie," no one of Hägar's entourage, not even Hägar himself, ever knew Lucky Eddie's "real" name until around the late 1990s and early 2000s, when he was asked directly (by Hägar himself on both separate occasions) to share his true name: during the first inquiry Eddie squawked out an unpronounceable screed which left him raw-throated and winded; during the second inquiry, in which Eddie asked for Hägar's assurance that this revelation would be kept "in confidence," Eddie whispers his "real" name into Hägar's ear, upon hearing which Hägar accidentally blurts out what was shared with him in secret in a fit of uncontrollable laughter, thus inadvertently revealing that Lucky Eddie's real name is "Fortuitous Eduardo". In the July 5, 2019 strip, Eddie tells Helga and Hägar that he was given his nickname by his maternal uncle who is a wordsmith specializing in oxymorons (an apparent reference to his being unlucky). His father is shown in the May 23, 2021 strip.
 Hamlet: Hägar and Helga's intelligent, clean, obedient and studious young son—almost always seen reading a book.  He shows no interest in becoming a Viking (he wants to be a dentist), which makes him the shame of the family to Hägar—though Helga and Honi are more tolerant and encourage his education. Even when Hägar forces him to practice his Viking skills, he's shown to be terrible at them. He is the victim of his would-be girlfriend Hernia's unrequited affection. Other times Hägar would try to make an effort relate to his son Hamlet, and the punchline being his dumbfoundedness, such as Hamlet asking the chicken and egg question. Hägar answers "the chicken!" but when Hamlet rhetorically asks "where was the egg it hatched from?", it then shows that day has turned to night and Hägar is still considering it (although it may also appear he is in deep thought about that philosophy). 
 Honi: Hägar and Helga's beloved, beautiful, sweet, cheerful 16-year-old daughter—dressed as a young Valkyrie with a winged helmet, metallic breastplate and a long skirt made of chainmail. Honi takes after Hägar's side of the family, a fact that her boyfriend Lute sometimes finds intimidating. She's a Viking warrior like her father, her weapons of choice are a spear and shield.  However, she's clueless about traditional "girlish" things, and tends to be overdramatic. Helga is constantly trying to marry her off, as she's seen as an "old maid" in their backward community. She was romantically involved with Lute the balladeer from the very beginning, and is the only character that can endure his terrible singing.
 Lute: an inept bard/minstrel/troubadour who can neither play, sing in tune nor rhyme properly, although Lute remains totally oblivious to everyone else's perception, and considers himself quite the talent. He is Honi's boyfriend, though Honi is in control of their relationship (similar to Helga and Hägar); they are perpetually engaged though they still haven't married. His name is in reference to the stringed instrument of the same name, which he is often seen playing (albeit poorly).
 Hernia: a young, tomboyish girl deeply infatuated with the sensitive Hamlet, though her love is unrequited, often to her comically melodramatic dismay.
 Snert: Hägar's dog; Snert is supposed to be a bird/hunting dog, but the reader gets the impression that most of the time he just doesn't feel like working. Snert understands everything Hägar tells him, but usually refuses to do what he's told. Sometimes Snert is depicted as having a "wife" and a couple of puppies, but they hardly play any role in the comic. Snert wears a (miniature) Viking helmet like everyone else in Hägar's household—including the pets.  Snert barks with a Viking accent ("voof").
 Kvack: the family's German duck. Kvack is Helga's friend and confidante—she will usually spy on Hägar and quack loudly whenever he does something he's not supposed to, such as having another hogshead of "Glögg" or "Wiffleberry wine", Hägar's frequently-imbibed beverages. Obviously, Hägar doesn't like Kvack at all—and would like to get rid of her. Being a German duck, Kvack "quacks" with an accent. Later in the strip, she brought home a litter of ducklings, which Helga "mothers" as if they were human grandchildren.
Dr. Zook: a cowled, druid-like "physician" who gives primarily nutritional and psychiatric advice, and is a notorious and dangerous quack. He always wears a hood that conceals his face except for his long nose which sticks out. On few occasions, however, his face has at least partially been seen.
Helga's Father: a geriatric Viking whose beard reaches the floor, with a taste for young women.
Helga's Mother: a stereotypically shrewish mother-in-law, with antlers on her helmet.
The Tax Collector: The King's officious emissary.
Mr. Giggles: a torturer who torments captives by forcible tickling.
Koyer the Lawyer: an unpleasant but effective barrister.
The Executioner: often accompanies the Tax Collector.
Brother Olaf: a monk who unsuccessfully explains to Hägar the concept of sin.
Other recurring minor characters include an unnamed psychic or soothsayer, whom Honi and Hägar regularly consult, a balding waiter at Helga's favorite restaurant, "The King of England", and various Anglo-Saxon raiders who serve as Hägar's friends and rivals, such as Dirty Dirk and Mean Max.

An example of one strip highlighting Hägar's good intentions but cluelessness: Hägar returns from looting Paris with a present for his wife, Helga. He tells her it was ripped off a tub in a palace. He then turns on the faucet and eagerly encourages her to watch. When nothing happens, Hägar comments, "That's funny, when I turned it on in the palace, water came out."

Licensing

For a brief time in the 1970s, the strip had its own brand of sponsored soda, "Sunday Funnies Cola", which would have Hägar strips on the side of the can. It was considered a marketing failure. Nearly two decades later, from 1989 to 1991, Hägar would once again be used in a soft drink endorsement in a series of radio and TV ads for Mug root beer, to far greater success. Most of the TV ads for Mug were the same ads that had premiered for Skol Lager in the UK, albeit redubbed and recolored to make reference to root beer.
In the UK, Hägar and other characters from the strip were also used to advertise Skol Lager beer, produced in Great Britain by Allied Breweries. Hägar appeared on billboards and in a series of popular television commercials that aired in the late 1980s. The TV spots were animated and mainly black and white, as per the daily newspaper comic strip, although the actual product always appeared in color.
From 1981 until the mid-1990s, a representation of Hägar served as the mascot for the Cleveland State University Vikings.
In the early-1990s, Hagar was used in print ads for the IBM RS/6000

TV guest appearances 
Hagar made his first animated appearance in a brief sketch paired with an interview of creator Dik Browne in the special The Fantastic Funnies broadcast on CBS May 15, 1980. 
Scott Beach (uncredited) provided the voice while the animation was produced by Bill Melendez and Lee Mendelson.

A live action Hagar sketch was included in the special Mother's Day Sunday Funnies broadcast May 8, 1983 on NBC.

TV special 
In 1989, an animated television special was aired, Hägar the Horrible: Hägar Knows Best produced by Hanna-Barbera and aired on CBS, based on the very first plotline when the strip began in 1973. Hägar returns home from battle after two years—and faces a major culture shock. His son Hamlet has bilged out of the Viking Academy, and his beloved daughter Honi is now dating a minstrel named Lute. Hagar blames Helga for allowing Honi to date Lute and being okay with Hamlet reading books. Hägar breaks up his daughter and trains his son in archery and other Viking venues. However, after seeing how unhappy his children have become, as well as other Vikings calling his kids weird, Hägar takes charge in his own way and sets things right.
The special starred Peter Cullen as Hägar, Lainie Kazan as Helga, Lydia Cornell as Honi, Josh Rodine as Hamlet, Jeff Doucette as Lucky Eddie, Don Most as Lute and Frank Welker as Snert, as well as providing additional voices.
It is available on DVD within the "Advantage Cartoon Mega Pack" set.

Movie project 
Variety reported in 2003 that Abandon Pictures had acquired the film rights to the comic strip and planned a live-action theatrical feature based on the character. According to emails leaked in the Sony Pictures Entertainment hack, a film adaptation was in development in 2013 and 2014 at Sony Pictures Animation. In late 2014, Chris Browne confirmed that a deal was made with Sony Pictures to produce a film based on the character.

Animated sitcom 
On November 10, 2020, it was announced a CGI animated series co-produced by King Features and The Jim Henson Company is currently in the works. The series will be animated by Henson Digital Puppetry Studio.

Video games 
Hägar the Horrible, a scrolling platform game, was released by Kingsoft for the Amiga in 1991. It was ported to Commodore 64 for the German market.

Book collections and reprints
All titles are mass-market paperbacks by Dik Browne, unless otherwise noted.
Hägar the Horrible #1 (1974) Tempo
Hägar the Horrible #2 (1975) Tempo
Hägar the Horrible on the Loose (#3) (1975) Tempo
Hägar the Horrible: The Big Bands Are Back! (trade paperback, 1975) Grosset & Dunlap
The Wit and Wisdom of Hägar the Horrible (trade paperback, 1975) Windmill/E.P. Dutton
Hägar the Horrible: The Brutish Are Coming (1976) Tempo
Hägar the Horrible on the Rack (1976) Tempo
Hägar the Horrible: Sack Time (1976) Tempo
Hägar the Horrible: Hägar's Night Out (1977) Tempo
Hägar the Horrible Brings 'Em Back Alive! (1977) Tempo
Hägar Hits the Mark: The Best of the Barbarian! (1977) Tempo
Hägar the Horrible: Born Leader (1978) Tempo
Hägar the Horrible: Hägar and the Basilisk and Other Tales (trade paperback, 1978) Sunridge Press
Hägar the Horrible: Ol' Blue Eyes Is Back! (1980) Tempo
Hägar the Horrible: Animal Haus! (1981) Tempo
Hägar the Horrible: My Feet Are Really Killing Me(1981) Tempo
The Best of Hägar the Horrible (trade paperback, 1981) Wallaby
The Very Best of Hägar the Horrible (trade paperback, 1982) Wallaby
Hägar the Horrible: Midnight Munchies (1982) Tempo
Hägar the Horrible: Vikings Are Fun (1982) Tor
Hägar the Horrible: Sacking Paris on a Budget (1982) Tor
Hägar the Horrible: Happy Hour (1983) Tempo
Hägar the Horrible: Helga's Revenge (1983) Tempo
Hägar the Horrible: Tall Tales (1983) Tor
Hägar the Horrible: Hear No Evil (Do No Work) (1983) Tor
Hägar the Horrible: Room for One More (1984) Tor
Hägar the Horrible: The Simple Life (1984) Charter
Hägar the Horrible: Excuse Me! (1984) Charter
Hägar the Horrible: Horns of Plenty (1984) Charter
Hägar the Horrible: Hägar at Work (1985) Tor
Hägar the Horrible: All the World Loves a Lover (1985) Tor
Hägar the Horrible: Face-Stuffer's Anonymous (1985) Tor
Hägar the Horrible: Gangway!! (1985) Tor
Hägar the Horrible: Roman Holiday (1985) Charter
Hägar the Horrible: Have You Been Uptight Lately? (1985) Charter
The Best of Hägar the Horrible (trade paperback, 1985) Comicana
Hägar the Horrible's Very Nearly Complete Viking Handbook by Dik Browne, Chris Browne (trade paperback, 1985) Workman Pub. 
Hägar the Horrible: Pillage Idiot (1986) Tor
Hägar the Horrible: Out on a Limb (1986) Tor
Hägar the Horrible: Strapped for Cash (1987) Charter
Hägar the Horrible: My Feet Are Drunk (1987) Jove
Hägar the Horrible: The Nord Star (1987) Jove
Hägar the Horrible: Spring Cleaning (1988) Jove
Hägar the Horrible: Hi Dear, Your Hair Looks Great! (1988) Jove
Hägar the Horrible and the Golden Maiden (1989) Tor
Hägar the Horrible: Sack Time (1989) Jove
Hägar the Horrible: Handyman Special (1989) Jove
Hägar the Horrible: Norse Code (1989) Jove
Hägar the Horrible: Smotherly Love (1989) Jove
Hägar the Horrible: Look Sharp! (1989) Jove
Hägar the Horrible: Silly Sailing (1990) Jove
Hägar the Horrible: Start the Invasion Without Me! (1990) Jove
Hägar the Horrible: A Piece of the Pie! (1990) Jove
Dik Browne's Hägar the Horrible: We're Doing Lunch by Chris Browne (1991) Jove
Dik Browne's Hägar the Horrible: I Dream of Genie!? (1991) Jove
Hägar the Horrible: I See London, I See France... (1991) Tor
Hägar the Horrible: Again & Again (1991) Tor
Hägar the Horrible: Fish Fly (1991) Tor
Hägar the Horrible: Special Delivery (1992) Tor
Hägar the Horrible: Motley Crew (1992) Tor
Hägar the Horrible: Things That Go Bump... (1992) Tor
Dik Browne's Hägar the Horrible: Another Fish Story by Chris Browne (1992) Jove
Dik Browne's Hägar the Horrible: Plunder Blunder by Chris Browne (1992) Jove
Dik Browne's Hägar the Huggable by Chris Browne (1993) Jove
Dik Browne's Hägar the Horrible: That Dreaded... Bed Head by Chris Browne (1993) Jove
Dik Browne's Hägar the Horrible: A Turn for the Worse by Chris Browne (1993) Jove
Dik Browne's Hägar the Horrible: Feeling "Fortune"-ate? by Chris Browne (1994) Jove
Dik Browne's Hägar the Horrible: Funny Bunnies by Chris Browne (1994) Jove
Hägar the Horrible: The Epic Chronicles: Dailies 1973–1974 by Dik Browne (hardcover, November 2010) Titan Books

Theme park
Hägar the Horrible is featured in the Universal Studios Florida theme park Islands of Adventure, where Hägar is seen on a boat on top of Toon Extra in Toon Lagoon.

References

External links 
 HägarTheHorrible.net
 Hagar the Horrible at Don Markstein's Toonopedia.  at Don Markstein's Toonopedia. Archived from the original on December 2, 2015.
 MobyGames - video games entry

American comic strips
Fictional Vikings
Comics set in the Viking Age
1973 comics debuts
Comics characters introduced in 1973
Gag-a-day comics
American comics characters
Comics about married people
Comics adapted into television series
Comics adapted into animated series
Comics adapted into video games
Comics about dogs
Comics about ducks
Comics set in Europe
Comics set in Norway
Comics set in France
Comics set in England